"Brown Sugar" is a song recorded by the English rock band the Rolling Stones. Written primarily by Mick Jagger, it is the opening track and lead single from their album Sticky Fingers (1971). It became a number one hit in both the United States and Canada. In the United Kingdom and Ireland, it charted at number two. In the United States, Billboard ranked it as the number 16 song for 1971. 

Rolling Stone ranked it number 495 on its list of the 500 Greatest Songs of All Time in 2010 and number 490 in 2004 and at number five on their list of the 100 Greatest Guitar Songs of All Time.

Inspiration and recording
Though credited to Jagger–Richards, "Brown Sugar" was primarily the work of Jagger, who wrote it sometime during the filming of Ned Kelly in 1969. According to Marsha Hunt, Jagger's girlfriend and the mother of his first child Karis, he wrote the song with her in mind. Former Ikette Claudia Lennear disputes this claim, saying that it was written about her. In 2014, Lennear told The Times that she is the subject of the song because she was dating Jagger when it was written. Bill Wyman stated in his book Rolling with the Stones (2002) that the lyrics were partially inspired by Lennear.

"Brown Sugar" was recorded over a three-day period at Muscle Shoals Sound Studio in Sheffield, Alabama, from 2 to 4 December 1969. The song was not released until over a year later due to legal wranglings with the band's former label. At the request of guitarist Mick Taylor (who had joined the band as Brian Jones' replacement in July 1969), the Stones debuted the number live during the infamous concert at the Altamont Speedway on 6 December 1969.

In the liner notes to the compilation album Jump Back (1993), Jagger says, "The lyric was all to do with the dual combination of drugs and girls. This song was a very instant thing, a definite high point".

"Brown Sugar" can be seen as a commentary on the history, morality, and dynamics of white-male-on-black-female sex, and how power and status has influenced it—particularly in Western culture. In a December 1995 Rolling Stone interview, Jagger spoke at length about the song, its inspiration, and its success, and credited himself with its lyrics. Keith Richards also credits Jagger with the song in his autobiography. Jagger attributed the success of the song to a "good groove". After noting that the lyrics could mean so many lewd subjects, he again noted that the combination of those subjects, the lyrical ambiguity was partially why the song was considered successful. He noted, "That makes it... the whole mess thrown in. God knows what I'm on about on that song. It's such a mishmash. All the nasty subjects in one go... I never would write that song now." When interviewer Jann Wenner asked him why, Jagger replied, "I would probably censor myself. I'd think, 'Oh God, I can't. I've got to stop. I can't just write raw like that.

An alternative version was recorded on 18 December 1970 at Olympic Studios in London during a birthday party for Richards and Bobby Keys. It features appearances by Al Kooper on piano, and Eric Clapton on slide guitar. The alternative version, which had previously been available only on bootleg recordings, was released in June 2015 on the Deluxe and Super Deluxe editions of the reissued Sticky Fingers album. There's also a bootleg version without the saxophone or acoustic guitars, only the main-riff electric guitar by Keith Richards and Mick Taylor, providing arpeggios and then a lead guitar solo, which he had been playing live and would continue until he left the band.

Release
"Brown Sugar" was released in April 1971 as the first single from the album. While the US single featured only "Bitch" as the B-side, the British release also featured a live rendition of Chuck Berry's "Let It Rock", recorded at the University of Leeds during the 1971 tour of the United Kingdom.

The song is also the first single released on Rolling Stones Records (catalogue number RS-19100) and is one of two The Rolling Stones songs (along with "Wild Horses") licensed to both the band and former manager Allen Klein (a result of various business disagreements), resulting in its inclusion on the compilation album Hot Rocks 1964–1971. "Brown Sugar" is also included on the most significant latter-day The Rolling Stones compilations, Jump Back, Forty Licks, and GRRR!.

To promote the song, The Rolling Stones performed on Top of the Pops with the performance taped sometime around late March 1971, and being shown on 15 April and 6 May. They performed "Brown Sugar", "Wild Horses", and "Bitch" for the show's segment dedicated to albums, which was shown on 22 April 1971; due to BBC practices at the time, the performances were erased and all that remains is "Brown Sugar". Saxophone player Trevor Lawrence mimes to Bobby Keys' actual solo.

In the United Kingdom, the single was originally issued in mono using a now-rarely heard bespoke mono mix. This mono mix has not been released on any compilation.

The song was performed routinely during The Rolling Stones' 1970 European Tour, occupying a prominent spot near the end of the set list even though audiences were unfamiliar with it. The band opened the shows of their infamous 1972 American Tour with "Brown Sugar", and it has since become a Stones concert staple. However, in more recent times, Jagger has changed some of the more controversial lyrics when performing the song live. For example, the first verse line "I hear him whip the women just around midnight" has been replaced with the more simple "you should have heard him just around midnight."

Critical reception 
Writing for Sounds in 1971, Penny Valentine praised "Brown Sugar", stating that it was her "choice as the best track".  Cash Box described the song as returning to "the fresh blues sound of the team's pre-Satanic days" with a "sax break, gritty wailing and the unique stones rhythm work." Writing for The Rag, rock critic Mike Saunders found the single to be the "only especially noteworthy" track of Sticky Fingers (1971).

The lyrical subject matter has often been a point of interest and controversy. Described by rock critic Robert Christgau as "a rocker so compelling that it discourages exegesis", the song's popularity has often overshadowed its provocative lyrics, which explore a number of controversial subjects, including slavery, interracial sex, cunnilingus, and drug use. Fifty years later, critic Tom Taylor concludes that the song "does not offer one considered thought to the subject matter that it sings of..." and "the atrocity of the slave trade, rape and the unimaginable suffering therein should not be adorned with gyrating, glib lyrics, guitar solos and no redeeming features in the way of discerned appraisal."

In 2021, the band announced that the song would be removed from the setlist of their US tour.

Cover versions 
Little Richard recorded a rendition of "Brown Sugar" for his album The King of Rock and Roll, released in 1971.

Chart performance

Weekly charts

Year-end charts

Certifications

Personnel
The Rolling Stones
 Mick Jagger – lead vocals, castanets, maracas
 Keith Richards – rhythm guitar, acoustic guitar, backing vocals
 Mick Taylor – lead guitar
 Bill Wyman – bass guitar
 Charlie Watts – drums

Additional personnel
 Ian Stewart – piano
 Bobby Keys – tenor saxophone

References

External links
 Lyrics of this song
  from 1975 compilation album Made in the Shade.
  from 1974 concert movie, Ladies and Gentlemen: The Rolling Stones, filmed during the Stones' American Tour 1972.

1971 singles
The Rolling Stones songs
Billboard Hot 100 number-one singles
Number-one singles in Switzerland
Songs written by Jagger–Richards
Song recordings produced by Jimmy Miller
Songs about heroin
Songs about New Orleans
British hard rock songs
RPM Top Singles number-one singles
Race-related controversies in music
Works about American slavery
Anti-black racism in England